Víctor Alonso Ábrego Aguilera (born 11 February 1997 in Bolivia) is a Bolivian footballer who plays for Club Bolívar.

Early life
Born in 1997, Ábrego grew up without knowing his father and was raised by his grandfather. At age 15, he received a scholarship to study in Pailón, where he helped his mother's friend with her chicken business, and worked as a waiter.

Career
In Pailón, he was nicknamed "Cantinflas" after the Mexican comedian.

In 2020, Ábrego was listed in World Soccer magazine's 500 Most Important Players.

International
He made his debut for the Bolivia national team in the 2022 FIFA World Cup qualification against Ecuador at home soil.

International goals

References

External links
 Víctor Ábrego at Soccerway

1997 births
Living people
Association football forwards
Bolivian footballers
Bolivia international footballers
Bolivia youth international footballers
Club Destroyers players
Club Bolívar players
Bolivian Primera División players
People from Chiquitos Province